The 2022 Girls' African Nations Volleyball Championship U19 was the 16th edition of the Girls' Africa Volleyball Championship U19, a biennial international women's volleyball tournament organised by the African Volleyball Confederation (CAVB) for the girls' under-19 national teams of Africa. It was held in Abuja, Nigeria from 2 to 5 September 2022.

This was the first edition to adopt the under-19 format instead of previous under-18, in accordance with the modifications made by the FIVB, which changed the age category of the Girls' Youth World Championship from U18 to U19.

Only three national teams took part in the tournament, with players born on or after 1 January 2005 eligible to participate.

Same as previous editions, the tournament acted as the CAVB qualifiers for the FIVB Volleyball Girls' U19 World Championship. The top two teams qualified for the 2023 FIVB Volleyball Girls' U19 World Championship in Croatia and Hungary as the CAVB representatives

Egypt won their eight title after beating the defending champions Cameroon 3–1 in the final. Both teams qualified for the 2023 FIVB Volleyball Girls' U19 World Championship.

Venue
Nigeria hosted the Girls' African Nations Volleyball Championship U19 for the second time after hosting the previous edition (U18) in 2021. The tournament was entirely played at the Moshood Abiola National Stadium in Abuja.

Results
All match times are in NGT (UTC+6), as listed by CAVB.

Group stage

|}

Final

|}

Individual awards
The following individual awards were presented at the end of the tournament.

 Most Valuable Player
 Malak Mohammed Yassin
 Best Spiker
 Shahd Ehab Mohammed
 Best Setter
 Farrid Osama

 Best Server
 Maram Amr Ebrahim
 Best Blocker
 Baran Akoung
 Best Libero
 Miriam Usman

References

2022 in volleyball
Volleyball in Nigeria
Sports competitions in Abuja
2022 in Nigerian sport